Qasr-e Khalil (also Romanized as Qaşr-e Khalīl) is a village in Dorudzan Rural District, Dorudzan District, Marvdasht County, Fars Province, Iran. At the 2006 census, its population was 1,092, in 238 families.

References 

Populated places in Marvdasht County